Papiria may refer to:

Papiria gens, family at ancient Rome
Gethyllis, genus of bulbous plant